Synergy is a 1999 studio album by the jazz fusion group Dave Weckl Band.

The album peaked at No. 25 on the Billboard Top Contemporary Jazz Albums chart.

Critical reception
AllMusic wrote that "Weckl has a solid team to work with and emphasizes improvisation and honest-to-God playing not high-tech studio gloss."

Track listing
"High Life" – 7:46
"Panda's Dream" – 5:21
"Swunk" – 4:49
"A Simple Prayer" – 4:53
"Cape Fear" – 6:54
"Wet Skin" – 6:10
"Synergy" – 7:13
"Where's My Paradise?" – 4:52
"Lucky Seven" – 5:55
"Swamp Thing" – 5:22
"Cultural Concurrence" – 3:24
"Tower '99" – 6:06

Personnel
Dave Weckl - drums, tambourine, percussion
Brandon Fields - soprano, tenor & baritone saxophones, keyboards, synthesizer
Jay Oliver - organ, keyboards, synthesizer
Buzz Feiten - electric, nylon string & steel string guitars
Tom Kennedy - bass

References

1999 albums
Dave Weckl albums